Amy Chozick is a writer-at-large at The New York Times focused on writing features about business, media and politics. Prior to her current role at the Times, Chozick was a national political reporter covering Hillary Clinton's 2016 presidential campaign.

Early life and education
Chozick grew up in a Jewish family in San Antonio, Texas, where she began working in journalism writing for the San Antonio Express-News as part of a program whereby she would get school credit for working off campus. She attended The University of Texas at Austin, where she was originally a journalism major, but switched to English and Latin American studies after three weeks.

Career
Chozick began writing about Clinton in 2007, while working for The Wall Street Journal. In 2008, she was a member of the traveling press of both Clinton and Barack Obama. Previously, she worked in a number of different places, including Tokyo. After writing for the Journal for eight years, she joined the Times in 2011 to write about corporate media. In 2013, she was promoted to the Times political team, with a focus on Hillary Clinton and the Clinton family. In 2016, she claimed that as a result of her reporting on Clinton, specifically on her allegedly clinching the Democratic nomination for president in June of that year, she had received death threats from supporters of Clinton's rival in this campaign, Bernie Sanders.

She is the author of "Chasing Hillary," a memoir about covering Clinton that is being developed into a TV series by Warner Bros.

Bibliography
Chasing Hillary: Ten Years, Two Presidential Campaigns, and One Intact Glass Ceiling, Harper, 2018,

Personal life
As of 2014, Chozick lives in the Lower East Side of New York City with her Irish-born husband, Robert Ennis. Chozick and Ennis have a son, who she had put off having so she could cover Clinton's presidential campaign.

References

External links

American political journalists
Jewish American journalists
Living people
The New York Times people
People from San Antonio
University of Texas at Austin College of Liberal Arts alumni
Year of birth missing (living people)
Place of birth missing (living people)
Journalists from Texas
21st-century American Jews